Vilantice is a municipality and village in Trutnov District in the Hradec Králové Region of the Czech Republic. It has about 200 inhabitants.

Administrative parts
The village of Chotěborky is an administrative part of Vilantice.

Notable people
František Xaver Dušek, (1731–1799), composer and musician

References

Villages in Trutnov District